Mount Swartley is a peak 1 nautical mile (1.9 km) east of Mount Darling in the Allegheny Mountains of the Ford Ranges, Marie Byrd Land. Discovered on aerial flights from West Base of the United States Antarctic Service (USAS) (1939–41) and named for Professor Stanley Swartley of Allegheny College, Pennsylvania.

References

Ford Ranges